Joseph Baermann Strauss (January 9, 1870 – May 16, 1938) was an American structural engineer who revolutionized the design of bascule bridges. He was the chief engineer of the Golden Gate Bridge in San Francisco, California.

Life, beginnings and death
He was born in Cincinnati, Ohio, to an artistic family of German-Jewish ancestry. His mother was a pianist, and his father, Raphael Strauss, was a writer and painter. He graduated from the University of Cincinnati in 1892 with a degree in civil engineering.  He served as both class poet and president, and was a brother of the Sigma Alpha Epsilon fraternity.

Strauss had many hobbies. One of these included poetry. After completion of the Golden Gate Bridge he returned to his passion of poetry and wrote his most recognizable poem "The Mighty Task is Done". He also wrote "The Redwoods", and his "Sequoia" can still be purchased by tourists visiting the California redwoods.

He died in Los Angeles, California, just one year after the Golden Gate's completion. His statue can be seen on the San Francisco side of the bridge. He is interred at Forest Lawn Memorial Park in Glendale.

Early career and the bascule bridge
Strauss was hospitalized while in college and his hospital room overlooked the John A. Roebling Suspension Bridge.  This sparked his interest in bridges. Upon graduating from the University of Cincinnati, Strauss worked at the Office of Ralph Modjeski, a firm which specialized in building bridges. At that time, bascule bridges were built with expensive iron counterweights.  He proposed using cheaper concrete counterweights in place of iron.  When his ideas were rejected, he left the firm and started his own firm, the Strauss Bascule Bridge Company of Chicago, where he revolutionized the design of bascule bridges.

Bridge designs
Strauss was the designer of the Burnside Bridge (1926) in Portland, Oregon, and the Lewis and Clark Bridge (1930) over the Columbia River between Longview, Washington, and Rainier, Oregon.  Strauss also worked with the Dominion Bridge Company in building the Cherry Street Strauss Trunnion Bascule Bridge (1931) in Toronto, Ontario. In 1912 he designed the HB&T Railway bascule bridge over Buffalo Bayou in Houston, Texas (now hidden under an Interstate 69 bridge in the shadow of downtown Houston). His design was also exported to Norway where Skansen Bridge (1918) is still in daily use.

But the Strauss bridge design was also copied and used in other places in Europe. Two bridges are still in daily use in Sweden - the railwaybridges over Trollhätte canal, in Vänersborg and Danviksbron in Stockholm. In Sête,  France, over Canal du Midi, another copy of Strauss designed bridges is to be found.

Golden Gate Bridge
As Chief engineer of the Golden Gate Bridge in San Francisco, California, Strauss overcame many problems. He had to find funding and support for the bridge from the citizens and the U.S. military. There were also innovations in the way the bridge was constructed. It had to span one of the greatest distances ever spanned, reach heights that hadn't been seen in a bridge, and hold up to the forces of the ocean.  He placed a brick from the demolished McMicken Hall at his alma mater, the University of Cincinnati, in the south anchorage before the concrete was poured.

Strauss was concerned with the safety of his workers. He required that a net be installed beneath the Golden Gate Bridge during construction. This net saved a total of 19 lives.

Strauss is credited as the chief engineer of the Golden Gate Bridge, but Charles Alton Ellis is responsible for most of the structural design. Because of a dispute with Strauss, however, Ellis was not recognized for his work when the bridge opened in 1937.
A plaque honoring Ellis was installed on the south tower in 2012, to acknowledge his contributions.

Other works
FEC Strauss Trunnion Bascule Bridge (Jacksonville, Florida)
Isleton Bridge
Johnson Street Bridge
Kinzie Street railroad bridge
Mystic River Bascule Bridge
St. Charles Air Line Bridge
Lewis and Clark Bridge (Columbia River)
Thames River Bridge (Amtrak)
Outer Drive Bridge
HX Draw
Lefty O'Doul Bridge

References

Further reading

External links

 
 Biography: Joseph Strauss, The American Experience, PBS
 Joseph Strauss quotations
 Joseph B. Straus online exhibition by Dr. Dorothy Byers, University of Cincinnati Libraries
Joseph Strauss Bridge Plans housed at Stanford Libraries

1870 births
1938 deaths
People from Cincinnati
American bridge engineers
American civil engineers
19th-century American engineers
20th-century American engineers
Structural engineers
History of San Francisco
People from San Francisco
American people of German-Jewish descent
University of Cincinnati alumni
Burials at Forest Lawn Memorial Park (Glendale)
Engineers from California
Engineers from Ohio